Ursuline College is a private Roman Catholic liberal arts college in Pepper Pike, Ohio. It was founded in 1871 by the Ursuline Sisters of Cleveland and was one of the oldest institutions of higher education for women in the United States and the first Catholic women's college in Ohio.

Academics
Ursuline College offers a diverse spectrum of undergraduate and graduate studies, including 30 undergraduate, 9 graduate, and 10 degree-completion programs. In 2016, Ursuline had a total student population of 1,175, with 59% undergraduate and 41% graduate students. While the traditional undergraduate programs remain women-focused, all of the programs welcome both women and men.

Location
Ursuline's campus features 5 educational buildings, including the Sister Diana Stano Athletic Center, the Parker Hannifin Center for the Creative Healing Arts & Sciences, and the Bishop Anthony M. Pilla Center. There are three residence halls: Murphy, Grace, and Smith. Murphy and Grace are traditional 2-person dorms and Smith is made up of 4-person suites.

Athletics

Ursuline College teams participate as a member of the National Collegiate Athletic Association's Division II. The Arrows are a member of the Great Midwest Athletic Conference (G-MAC), but used to be a member of the National Association of Intercollegiate Athletics' now-defunct American Mideast Conference (AMeC) until the 2011–12 season. Women's sports include basketball, bowling, cross country, golf, lacrosse, soccer, softball, swimming & diving, tennis, track & field and volleyball.

References

External links
 Official website 
 Official athletics website

Ursuline colleges and universities
Universities and colleges in Cuyahoga County, Ohio
Women's universities and colleges in the United States
Educational institutions established in 1871
1871 establishments in Ohio
Catholic universities and colleges in Ohio
Great Midwest Athletic Conference schools
Roman Catholic Diocese of Cleveland
History of women in Ohio